Keystone Shipping Company of Philadelphia, Pennsylvania is a major shipping and transportation company. Keystone Shipping Company operates a fleet of ships for both dry bulk cargo and tankers. Since World War I, the Keystone Shipping Company has been active in the worldwide support of the United States Armed Forces. Keystone Shipping Company is part of the Ready Reserve Fleet program. Keystone Shipping Company was founded by Charles Kurz.  Before Keystone Shipping Company, Charles Kurz was a shipping agent, commodities trader, and ship owner. Keystone Shipping Company headquarters is in Bala Cynwyd, Pennsylvania.

Keystone Shipping Company has a fleet of over 20 ships. The fleet consists of: tankers, dry bulk ships, tugboats, tank barges, and roll-on/roll-off ships. Keystone Shipping Company tanker fleet transports crude oil and other petroleum products to both coasts in the United States.

Key Lakes
Key Lakes of Duluth, Minnesota is a subsidiary Keystone Shipping Company operating on the Great Lakes with 20 ships. Key Lakes operated tankers, dry bulk ships, tugboats, tank barges, and roll-on/roll-off ships.

Alaska Tanker Company
Keystone Shipping Company entered into a partnership with in the Alaska Tanker Company. Alaska Tanker Company founded in 1999. 
The other partners were: OSG America Operating Company of Tampa, Florida and BP Oil Shipping Company. Overseas Shipholding Group, Inc. (NYSE: OSG), purchased all the shares of Alaska Tanker Company on March 12, 2020, and now is a subsidiary of Overseas Shipholding Group, Inc. of Tampa. Alaska Tanker Company transport of Alaskan crude oil with four 190,000 tons tankers. Alaska Tanker Company headquarters is in Beaverton, Oregon.

Ships:
Alaska Legend
Alaska Explorer
Alaska Frontier
Alaska Navigator

Keystone Shipping Company ships
 Some of Keystone Shipping Company ships:
MV Cape Kennedy (T-AKR-5083)
SS Denebola (T-AKR-289)
RS RocketShip primary route is moving rocket parts of ULA Atlas V, Delta IV and Vulcan rockets Cape Canaveral and Vandenberg. 
SS Denebola (T-AKR-289)
MV Cape Knox (T-AKR-5082)
MV Cape Kennedy (T-AKR-5083)
USNS Potomac (T-AO-181)
MV Roger Blough

Some Past ships
SS Chancellorsville T2 
SS Fredericksburg (1958) 1976–2004
SS Murfreesboro T2 
SS Perryville T2 
SS Pueblo T2 
 Birch Coulie 
 Oakley Wood  
 Henry C. Wallace  
 New Zealand Victory  
 David Holmes 
 Alan Seeger  
 Little Big Horn 
 Fort Capot River  
MV Sea Isle City
SS Bridgeton
USS Saugatuck

World War II
Keystone Shipping Company was a major tanker operator during World War II. Keystone Shipping Company operated a fleet of tankers for the War Shipping Administration.  Keystone Shipping Company operated Type T2 tankers and other tankers.  Keystone Shipping Company operated for the war a fleet of over 60 tankers. Each Keystone Shipping Company had a merchant crew of about 9 officers and 39 men. 

Charles Kurz became the head of the War Shipping Administration (WSA) during World War II, in addition to operating ships.

Some ships operated for World War II:
SS Santee 

Liberty ships:
 Christopher L. Sholes 
 Charles A. Wickliffe  
 Andrew A. Humpreys  
 Henry L. Ellsworth 
 Thomas F. Cunningham  
 David Holmes 
 Oscar F. Barrett 
 Oscar S. Straus 

T2 Tankers
 Bennington 
 Bunker Hill

See also
World War II United States Merchant Navy

External links
 The T2 Tanker page
 T-tanker list

References   

Keystone Shipping Company
Tanker shipping companies
Petroleum industry
Container shipping companies
Supply shipping companies
Logistics companies of the United States
Logistics industry in the United States